Ahmed Kotb (born 23 July 1991), or Ahmed El-Kotb, is an Egyptian indoor volleyball player. Since 2008 he is a member of the Egypt men's national volleyball team, where he goes by the nickname Kotb. He competed at the 2016 Summer Olympics and 2014 World Championships.

Sporting achievements

Clubs 
 Al Ahly SC  :

-  6 × Egyptian Volleyball League : 2008/09,2009/10,2010/11, 2012/13, 2013/14, 2017/18.

-  5 × Egyptian Volleyball Cup : 2009/10, 2010/11, 2012/13, 2013/14, 2017/18 .

-  5 × African Clubs Championship (volleyball) :  2010 - 2011 - 2015 - 2017 - 2018 .

-  1 × Arab Clubs Championship (volleyball) : 2010.

National team

  3 × Men's African Volleyball Championship : 2011-2013-2015
  1 × Arab Games :  2016

Individually
 Top scorer at  2016 Volleyball world League Level 2 
 Best Spiker at (2011 African Clubs Championship )
 Best Spiker at (2014 African Clubs Championship )
 MVP at (2015 African Clubs Championship)
 MVP at (2017 African Clubs Championship)

References

External links
 http://worldleague.2016.fivb.com/en/group2/competition/results_and_statistics
 https://www.kingfut.com/2018/04/05/al-ahly-african-champions-el-geish/
 http://clubworldchampionships.2015.men.fivb.com/en/competition/teams/ahl-ahly%20sporting%20club/players/ahmed-el-kotb?id=48922

1991 births
Egyptian men's volleyball players
Al Ahly (men's volleyball) players
Living people
Olympic volleyball players of Egypt
Volleyball players at the 2016 Summer Olympics